Wonder is an album by Christian recording artist Michael W. Smith. Released in September 2010, the album peaked at No. 2 on the Top Christian Albums chart, and number 26 on the Billboard 200.

Track listing

Personnel 
 Michael W. Smith – vocals, acoustic piano, keyboards, Hammond B3 organ, guitars
 Bryan Lenox – keyboards
 Jim Daneker – programming (12)
 Ben Gowell – guitars
 Adam Lester – guitars
 Tommy Sims – guitars
 Jacob Lowery – bass
 Dan Needham – drums
 Byron Chambers – talk box
 Cara Slaybaugh – cello (10)
 Nickie Conley – backing vocals (4)
 Missi Hale – backing vocals (4)
 Darwin Hobbs – backing vocals (4)
 Calvin Nowell – backing vocals (4)
 Chris Rodriguez – backing vocals (4)
 Debi Selby – backing vocals (4)

Strings (Tracks 9, 11 & 12)
 David Davidson – string arrangements (9, 11)
 Jim Daneker – orchestral arrangements (12)
 David Angell, Monisa Angell, John Catchings, David Davidson, Conni Ellisor, Jack Jezioro, Anthony LaMarchina, Pamela Sixfin and Kristin Wilkinson – string players

Gang vocals on "Take My Breath Away"
 Shirley Anderson, Lanny Anderson, JoJo Campbell, Oliver Campbell, Camryn Clark, Catherine Clark, Skylar Cochran, Dallas Dudley, Noah Elwood, Georgia Elwood, Tanner Lenox, Teagan Lenox, Treven Lenox, Tammy Lenox, Titus Lenox, Jessebeth Lowery, Jacob Lowery, Trevor Mathiesen, Judah McKeehan, Leo McKeehan, Marley McKeehan, Moses McKeehan and Bradley Pooler

Production 
 Michael W. Smith – producer, executive producer
 Bryan Lenox – producer, recording, mixing
 Greg Ham – executive producer
 Terry Hemmings – executive producer
 Jason McArthur – A&R direction
 Kyle Lee – recording, mixing
 Aaron Chmielewski – recording
 Daryl Dudley II – assistant engineer
 Grant Harrison – assistant engineer
 Tanner Lenox – assistant engineer
 Baeho 'Bobby' Shin – piano and strings recording at Wildwood Recording, Franklin, Tennessee
 Taemin Daniel Choi – piano and strings recording assistant
 Juyoung "Genie" Yim – piano and strings recording assistant
 Elliott Eicheldinger – mix assistant
 Scott Lenox – mix assistant
 Brad Pooler – mix assistant
 Jim Daneker – computer technician 
 Chris Athens – mastering 
 Gabrielle Crisp – production coordination
 Dallas Dudley – production coordination, assistant engineer
 Trevor Mathiesen – production coordination
 Michelle Box – A&R production
 Beth Lee – art direction
 Tim Parker – art direction, design
 Amy Dickerson – photography
 Melanie Shelley – hair, make-up
 Katy Robbins – wardrobe

Studios
 Recorded at Quad Studios (Nashville, Tennessee) and Emack Studios (Franklin, Tennessee).
 Piano and strings recorded at Wildwood Recording (Franklin, Tennessee)
 Mixed at The Bird House (Franklin, Tennessee).
 Mastered at Sterling Sound (New York City, New York).

Promotion and release
Smith's first single for the album "Save Me From Myself" debuted at No. 17 on the US Hot Christian Songs Chart, and No. 33 on the Canadian Christian Songs Chart. The song is originally written and performed by the Danish rock band Carpark North. A month before the release of the album, Smith released an extended play with four songs from the album: "Save Me From Myself", "Run to You", "You Belong to Me", and "Forever Yours".

Critical reception

Dave Wood of Louder Than the Music gave the album 4 out of 5 stars commenting on how Smith "able to produce albums of the highest ." Deborah Evans Price of Billboard gave the album a positive review, saying "Michael has never sounded more compelling or impassioned."

Charts

References

2010 albums
Michael W. Smith albums
Reunion Records albums